Tomb A.24 is the modern number given to a now lost Theban tomb in Dra' Abu el-Naga'. The burial dates to the ancient Egyptian 18th Dynasty and belongs to the second priest of Amun Simut. The tomb was already known in the early 19th century and was visited by several early travelers, such as Jean-François Champollion and John Gardner Wilkinson. Especially the latter made several copies of the painted decoration. He seems to have seen the tomb in a fairly good state of preservation while it was already more destroyed when Jean-François Champollion came later. He copied some inscriptions. Several scenes can be reconstructed from these early accounts. There was a depiction showing the family of Simut receiving offerings, most likely in connection with a festival, called the Valley festival. The second scene shows the family of Simut hunting in the marshes. The scene was drawn by John Gardner Wilkinson and later published by him. A third scene must have shown vintage. Wilkinson only copied a small detail. Another scene seems to have shown Simut in front of scribes, men weighing and Nubians bringing tribute. The scene most likely relates to the office of Simut, who most likely also looked after the magazines of the Temple of Amun in Karnak.

See also
 List of Theban Tombs

References 

Theban tombs
Eighteenth Dynasty of Egypt